ETP may refer to: 

 Eastern Treatment Plant, in Melbourne, Australia
 Economic Transformation Programme, in Malaysia
 Effluent treatment plant
 Ekalokam Trust for Photography, in Tamil Nadu, India
 Electrolytic tough-pitch, a type of oxygen-free copper
 Electronics Training Program of the United States Navy
 Employment termination payment
 Energy Technology Perspectives, an annual report series of the International Energy Agency
 Endogenous thrombin potential
 Energy Transfer Partners, an American natural gas and propane company
 Entertainment Technology Partners, an American entertainment technology company
 Entrepreneurship Theory and Practice, a scholarly journal
 Ethical Tea Partnership
 Ethylene to propylene
 European Technology Platform for the Electricity Networks of the Future
 European training programs
 Exchange-traded product